Raoul Lambert (born 20 October 1944) is a Belgian retired footballer who played as a striker. He finished top scorer of the Belgian First Division with 17 goals in 1972 while playing for Club Brugge. He also scored 18 goals in 33 matches with the Belgium national team between 1966 and 1977. Lambert made his international debut on 20 April 1966 in a 3–0 friendly win against France and he scored. He was in the team for the 1970 FIFA World Cup and the Euro 72. Throughout Raoul's career he stayed at Club Brugge, scoring a total of 270 goals in 458 matches in all competitions.

He is the brother of footballer Eric Lambert.

Honours 
Club Brugge Belgian First Division: 1972–73, 1975–76, 1976–77, 1977–78, 1979–80
 Belgian Cup: 1967–68, 1969–70, 1976–77 UEFA Cup: runner-up 1975–76
 European Cup: runner-up 1977–78
 Jules Pappaert Cup: 1972, 1978Belgium UEFA European Championship: third place 1972Individual Belgian First Division top scorer: 1971–72 (17 goals)'''
 UEFA Euro Team of the Tournament: 1972
Best Club Brugge player of the Century (2007)
Best West-Flanders footballer of all time (2009)

References

External links

Club Brugge profile 

1944 births
Living people
Footballers from Bruges
Belgian footballers
Association football forwards
Belgium international footballers
Belgian Pro League players
Club Brugge KV players
1970 FIFA World Cup players
UEFA Euro 1972 players